Mischa is a diminutive form of the name Mikhail.

Men 
 Mischa Auer (1905–1967), Russian actor born Mikhail Semyonovich Unskovsky
 Mikhail Mischa Bakaleinikoff (1890–1960), Russian-born musical director, Hollywood film composer and conductor
 Mischa Berlinski (born 1973), American writer
 Mischa Boelens (born 1995), Curaçaoan footballer
 Mischa Cotlar (1913–2007), Ukraine mathematician
 Mischa Daniels, Dutch music producer
 Mischa Dohler (born 1975), Fellow of the Institute of Electrical and Electronics Engineers and the Royal Society of Arts
 Mikhail Mischa Elman (1891–1967), Ukrainian-born Jewish-American violinist
 Mischa Hausserman (born 1941), Austrian-American actor
 Mischa Hiller (born 1962), British novelist
 Mischa Keijser (born 1974), Dutch contemporary photographer
 Mischa Maisky, Soviet-born Israeli cellist
 Mischa Markow (1854–1934), pioneering Mormon missionary in Europe
 Mischa Mischakoff (1895–1981), Ukrainian-born American violinist and concertmaster 
 Mischa Portnoff (1901–1979), German-born American composer and teacher
 Mischa Richter (1910–2001), American cartoonist best known for his work in The New Yorker
 Mischa Schwartz (born 1926), professor emeritus of electrical engineering at Columbia University
 Mischa Spoliansky (1898–1985), Russian-born composer
 Markus Wolf (1923–2006), East German spymaster
 Mikhail Mischa Zverev (born 1987), German tennis player

Women 
 Mischa Finch (born 1970), American born vocalist, actress, writer and human rights activist
 Mischa Barton (born 1986), British-American actress and former child model
 Mischa Merz (born 1957), Australian boxer, painter and journalist

Fictional characters 
 Mischa, a tomcat in the 1996 Japanese anime TV series The Story of Cinderella by Hiroshi Sasagawa
 Mischa Fox, in the 1956 novel The Flight from the Enchanter by Iris Murdoch
 Mischa Lecter, in the novel Hannibal, sister of Hannibal Lecter
 Mischa Bachinski, in the Canadian musical “Ride the Cyclone” with music and lyrics by Jacob Richmond and Brooke Maxwell.

See also 
 Misha (disambiguation)
 Measha Brueggergosman, (born 1977), a Canadian soprano

English unisex given names
Hypocorisms